Giuseppe Galluzzo (born May 30, 1960 in Siderno) is an Italian football coach and former professional player who played as a striker. He scored twice from four games in Serie A for A.C. Milan in the 1979–80 season and made nearly 350 appearances in the Italian professional leagues.

References

1960 births
Living people
Italian footballers
Association football forwards
Calcio Lecco 1912 players
A.C. Milan players
A.C. Monza players
S.P.A.L. players
S.S.C. Bari players
U.S. Cremonese players
A.C. Ancona players
Spezia Calcio players
S.S. Fidelis Andria 1928 players
F.C. Crotone players
Serie A players
Serie B players
Italian football managers
U.S. Catanzaro 1929 managers
U.S. Castrovillari Calcio managers